Adil Azbague (born 6 January 1995) is a professional footballer who plays as a midfielder for Championnat National 2 club Beauvais. Born in France, he represents Morocco at international level.

International career
Azbague was born in France to parents of Moroccan descent. He was called up and capped for the Morocco U23s in a 1–0 friendly win against the Cameroon U23s.

References

External links
 
 

1995 births
Living people
Association football midfielders
Moroccan footballers
Morocco youth international footballers
French footballers
French sportspeople of Moroccan descent
CS Avion players
Arras FA players
Valenciennes FC players
US Quevilly-Rouen Métropole players
SCC Mohammédia players
Ittihad Khemisset players
AS Beauvais Oise players
Championnat National 3 players
Ligue 2 players
Championnat National players
Championnat National 2 players